Eckstolonol is a phlorotannin found in the edible brown algae arame (Eisenia bicyclis) and turuarame (Ecklonia stolonifera).

References 

Phlorotannins